The 2020–21 FC Krasnodar season was the tenth successive season that Krasnodar played in the Russian Premier League, the highest tier of association football in Russia. They finished the previous season in 3rd place, qualifying for the UEFA Champions League for the second time, entering at the third qualifying round. They also took part in the Russian Cup. Krasnodar finished the season in 10th position, were knocked out of the Russian Cup at the Round of 16 stage by Sochi, finished third in their UEFA Champions League group before being knocked out of the UEFA Europa League by Dinamo Zagreb at the Round of 32.

Season events
On 29 July 2020, Igor Smolnikov re-signed for Krasnodar on a two-year contract after leaving Zenit St.Petersburg.
On 5 August, Krasnodar announced that Yevgeni Gorodov had returned to the club on a two-year contract, having previously played for Krasnodar between 2011 and 2013.

On 13 September, Krasnodar's away game against Rotor Volgograd was postponed due to 10 cases of COVID-19 within the Rotor squad. Three days later, Krasnodar were awarded a 3–0 technical victory over Rotor Volgograd.

On 15 September, Uroš Spajić was loaned to Feyenoord for the remainder of the season.

On 6 October, Krasnodar announced the signing of Yevgeni Chernov from Rostov on a contract until the end of the 2023/24 season, and the signing of Yevgeni Markov from Dynamo Moscow on a contract until the summer of 2022. On 15 October, Krasnodar signed Aleksei Ionov from Rostov on a contract until the summer of 2023.

On 12 January, Krasnodar announced the signing of Igor Andreyev from Nosta Novotroitsk to Krasnodar-2.

On 12 February, Krasnodar announced the loan signing of Ambroise Oyongo from Montpellier until the end of the season.

On 25 February, Krasnodar signed Yegor Baburin on loan from Rostov, whilst Denis Adamov left the club to join Sochi.

Following Krasnodar's 0–5 defeat to Akhmat Grozny on 3 April, Head Coach Murad Musayev resigned from his position. On 5 April, Krasnodar announced the appointment of Viktor Goncharenko as their new Head Coach on a contract until the summer of 2023.

Squad

Out on loan

Transfers

In

Loans in

Out

Loans out

Released

Friendlies

Competitions

Overview

Premier League

League table

Results summary

Results by round

Results

Russian Cup

UEFA Champions League

Play-off round

Group stage

UEFA Europa League

Knockout phase

Squad statistics

Appearances and goals

|-
|colspan="14"|Players away from the club on loan:
|-
|colspan="14"|Players who left Krasnodar during the season:
|}

Goal scorers

Clean sheets

Disciplinary record

References

FC Krasnodar seasons
Krasnodar
Krasnodar